The Final Sign of Evil is the twelfth studio album by German thrash metal band Sodom, released in 2007. The album includes re-recorded songs from In the Sign of Evil as well as seven songs originally written for it, but not recorded due to the label's inability to pay for studio time. As a result, In the Sign of Evil was released as an EP with the original versions of the tracks rather than a full-length album.

Track listing

Personnel
Tom Angelripper – vocals, bass
Grave Violator – guitar
Chris Witchhunter – drums

References

Sodom (band) albums
2007 albums
SPV/Steamhammer albums